The Pacific Heights Stakes is run each year at Golden Gate Fields in the San Francisco Bay Area.  Named for a hilly section of the city of San Francisco, the race is restricted to California bred fillies and mares, 3 years old and up, and run at a distance of 8 furlongs on the turf.  

An ungraded stakes, it offers a purse of $75,000.

The 2008 Pacific Heights was run on Golden Gate Fields' synthetic Tapeta racing surface.

Past winners

 2011 - Antares World (Frank Alvarado)
 2010 - Catsalot (Julien Couton)
 2009 - Lady Railrider (Frank Alvarado)
 2008 - Lady Railrider (Frank Alvarado)
 2007 - Somethinaboutlaura (Russell Baze)
 2006 - Somethinaboutlaura (Russell Baze)

External links
 Golden Gate Fields website

Horse races in California
Golden Gate Fields
Ungraded stakes races in the United States
Turf races in the United States